Ludvig Mylius-Erichsen (15 January 1872 – 25 November 1907) was a Danish author, ethnologist, and explorer, from Ringkøbing. He was most notably an explorer of Greenland.

Literary expedition
With Count Harald Moltke and Knud Rasmussen Mylius-Erichsen formed the Danish Literary Expedition (1902–04) to West Greenland, and, in the early stages (1902), discovered, near Evighedsfjord, two ice-free mountain ranges. The party later proceeded to Cape York and lived for 10 months in native fashion with the Eskimo. The return journey of the expedition to Upernavik across the ice of Melville Bay was the first sledge crossing on record.

Denmark expedition

As commander of the Denmark Expedition (1906–08) Mylius-Erichsen undertook and carried out the task of exploring and charting the entire coastline of unknown northeast Greenland by three months' field work. The expedition made sledge journeys of more than 4000 miles (6,436 km), exceeding the record of any single Arctic force. The main travel, excluding duplications, of Johan Peter Koch was some 1250 miles (2011 km), and that of Mylius-Erichsen must have exceeded 1000 miles (1609 km). Their explorations showed that Robert Peary's chart of a coast trending southeast from Navy Cliff was radically incorrect. Instead the shore ran to the northeast, adding about 100,000 square miles (259,000 km2) to Greenland and extending it about halfway from Navy Cliff—where the maps wrongly placed Greenland Sea—to Spitzbergen. Mylius-Erichsen's own exploration proved that Peary Channel did not exist. Two years later Ejnar Mikkelsen (1880–1971), leader of a new Danish Greenland expedition, assumed the channel existed until he found Mylius-Erichsen's report in a cairn at the head of Danmark Fjord, where Mylius-Erichsen had written emphatically that: 
 
Mylius-Erichsen established the continuity of Greenland from Cape Farewell, 60° N, to the most northern land ever reached, 83° 39' N. He also discovered and explored the great fiords of Danmark, Hagen, and Brønlund.

Death
Misled by existing maps, Mylius-Erichsen with Niels Peter Høeg Hagen and the Greenlander Jørgen Brønlund so prolonged his journey that a return to the ship that spring was impossible, and they were forced to spend the summer in the area of the Denmark Fjord without the necessary footgear for hunting in the stony area. The need for food for men and dogs forced them to reduce their three dogteams to one. Finally, in September, they were able to start their return journey on the new frozen sea ice, around the northeastern corner of Greenland. However, when they arrived at the southern shore of Mallemuk Mountain, they found open water and were forced to travel inland. En route, Mylius-Erichsen and Hagen perished of starvation, exhaustion, and cold walking on the ice of the Nioghalvfjerd Fjord. Hagen's map sketches and the body of Brønlund together with his diary were found next spring by Koch in Lambert Land. Some cairn reports, left at Danmark Fjord by Mylius-Erichsen, were found and brought to Copenhagen by Ejnar Mikkelsen in 1912.

Works
 Tatere (1898), a drama  
 Vestjyder (1900), tales  
 Den Jydske Hede før og nu (1903)  
 Isblink (1904), poems from Greenland  
 Grønland (1906)  
 Report on the nonexistence of Peary Channel in Meddelelser om Grønland, (50 volumes, Copenhagen, 1876–1912), volume xli (1913), edited by Ejnar Mikkelsen.

Honours
Mylius-Erichsen Land in northern Greenland was named after him.
Denmark Expedition Memorial in Copenhagen.
A silver commemorative medal issued in 1933 —25 years after the expedition— by Alf Trolle (1879–1949), captain of expedition ship Danmark and leader of the Denmark expedition after Mylius-Erichsen's death.

Literature 
 Achton Friis, Danmark Expeditionen til Grönlands Nordostkyst (1909), reprinted in 1987 and 2005.  
 Greely, True Tales of Arctic Heroism (New York, 1912)  
 Rasmussen, People of the Polar North (Philadelphia, 1908)  
 G. C. Amdrup, Report on the Denmark Expedition to the North-East Coast of Greenland (Copenhagen, 1913).
 Ole Ventegodt, "Den sidste Brik", Copenhagen, 1997
 Peter Freuchen, "Min grønlandske ungdom", 1936 (Memories)

See also 
 Cartographic expeditions to Greenland

References

External links
 
 
 Photo

1872 births
1907 deaths
Danish explorers
Scandinavian explorers of North America
Greenlandic polar explorers
Danish male writers
People from Ringkøbing-Skjern Municipality